The 2020 O'Reilly Auto Parts 500 was a NASCAR Cup Series race that was originally scheduled to be held on March 29, 2020 and was rescheduled to July 19, 2020, at Texas Motor Speedway in Fort Worth, Texas. Contested over 334 laps on the 1.5-mile (2.4 km) intermediate quad-oval, it is the 18th race of the 2020 NASCAR Cup Series season. Austin Dillon won, bringing Richard Childress Racing their first 1-2 finish since the 2011 Good Sam Club 500.

Report

Background

Texas Motor Speedway is a speedway located in the northernmost portion of the U.S. city of Fort Worth, Texas – the portion located in Denton County, Texas. The track measures  around and is banked 24 degrees in the turns, and is of the oval design, where the front straightaway juts outward slightly. The track layout is similar to Atlanta Motor Speedway and Charlotte Motor Speedway (formerly Lowe's Motor Speedway). The track is owned by Speedway Motorsports, Inc., the same company that owns Atlanta and Charlotte Motor Speedways, as well as the short-track Bristol Motor Speedway.

Entry list
 (R) denotes rookie driver.
 (i) denotes driver who are ineligible for series driver points.

Qualifying
Aric Almirola was awarded the pole for the race as determined by a random draw.

Starting Lineup

 Team Keller Racing did not have a driver announced when they entered for the race and they could not race since 41 cars entered for 40 spots, so their entry was excluded due to lack of owners points and their driver was not announced.

Race

Stage Results

Stage One
Laps: 105

Stage Two
Laps: 105

Final Stage Results

Stage Three
Laps: 124

Race statistics
 Lead changes: 29 among 12 different drivers
 Cautions/Laps: 10 for 45
 Red flags: 1 for 11 minutes and 29 seconds
 Time of race: 3 hours, 38 minutes and 57 seconds
 Average speed:

Media

Television
NBC Sports broadcast the race on NBCSN. Rick Allen, Two–time Texas winner Jeff Burton, Steve Letarte and 2000 Texas winner Dale Earnhardt Jr. covered the action from the booth at Charlotte Motor Speedway for the race. Dave Burns and Marty Snider handled the pit road duties on site. Rutledge Wood handled the features from his home during the race.

Radio
The race was broadcast on radio by the Performance Racing Network and simulcast on Sirius XM NASCAR Radio.

Standings after the race

Drivers' Championship standings

Manufacturers' Championship standings

Note: Only the first 16 positions are included for the driver standings.
. – Driver has clinched a position in the NASCAR Cup Series playoffs.

References

O'Reilly Auto Parts 500
O'Reilly Auto Parts 500
2020s in Fort Worth, Texas
O'Reilly Auto Parts 500
NASCAR races at Texas Motor Speedway